Botryosphaeria quercuum is a fungal plant pathogen that causes cankers in avocado and dieback on mango.

References

quercuum
Fungal tree pathogens and diseases
Mango tree diseases
Avocado tree diseases
Fungi described in 1863
Taxa named by Lewis David de Schweinitz